(September 11, 1971) is a Japanese manga artist best known for creating the Chrono Crusade series which was adapted into a 24 episodes anime series by the studio Gonzo. Moriyama worked on a series called World Embryo, which was serialized in the Young King OURs magazine from 2005 to 2014.

Career

List of works
Chrono Crusade (1999–2004, serialized in Dragon Age, Kadokawa Shoten)
Koko ni Iru Suiren (2002, short stories collection, Kadokawa Shoten)
Planet Blue (2005, one-shot published in Champion Red, Akita Shoten)
World Embryo (2005–2014, serialized in Young King OURs, Shōnen Gahōsha)
Mahou Ineko to Ibarahime (2008, a Yuri one-shot published in Dengeki Daioh, ASCII Media Works. It was revived as short serialization in Dengeki Comic Next, as of 2015).
Mousou Kikou (2010–2011, serialized in Dengeki Daioh Genesis, ASCII Media Works)
Thou Shalt Not Die (2014–2020, written by Yoko Taro, serialized in Monthly Big Gangan, Square Enix)
Fate/stay night Unlimited Blade Works (2021–present, serialized in Dengeki Daioh)

Video games
Alice in Cyberland (1996).

References

External links

 Official English Daisuke Moriyama's Chrono Crusade Gonzo website
 
 Daisuke Moriyama on Pixiv

1971 births
Living people
Manga artists from Kōchi Prefecture